Events in the year 1636 in the Spanish Netherlands and Prince-bishopric of Liège (predecessor states of modern Belgium).

Incumbents

Habsburg Netherlands
Monarch – Philip IV, King of Spain and Duke of Brabant, of Luxembourg, etc.

Governor General – Cardinal-Infante Ferdinand of Austria

Prince-Bishopric of Liège
Prince-Bishop – Ferdinand of Bavaria

Events
April
 29 April – Dutch forces retake Schenkenschans.

July
 2 July – Army of Flanders goes onto the offensive in the Franco-Spanish War (1635–59), invading French territory.
 17 July – People of Liège appeal to Pope Urban VIII against imperial troops called in by prince-bishop Ferdinand.

August
 5 August – Crossing of the Somme by the Army of Flanders.
 7 August – Corbie invested.
 15 August – Corbie taken.

November
 14 November – French forces retake Corbie.

Publications
 Lazarus Marcquis, Volcomen tractaet van de peste (Antwerp, Caesar Joachim Trognaesius) – a treatise on the pestilence. Available on the Internet Archive

Works of art
 Anthony van Dyck – Charles I in Three Positions, now in the Royal Collection.
 Peter Paul Rubens
 Hercules' Dog Discovers Purple Dye, now in the Musée Bonnat, Bayonne.
 Helena Fourment with Children, now in the Louvre Museum, Paris.
 Saturn, now in the Museo del Prado, Madrid.
 The Rainbow Landscape, now in the Wallace Collection, London.
 A View of Het Steen in the Early Morning, now in the National Gallery, London.

Births
January
 12 January – Jean-Baptiste Monnoyer, painter (died 1699)

June
 22 June – Albertus Clouwet, engraver (died 1679)

Deaths
Date uncertain
 Philippe de Caverel (born 1555), abbot
 Matthijs Langhedul, organ builder
 Joannes Woverius (born 1576), councillor

January
 19 January – Marcus Gheeraerts the Younger (born 1561/2), painter

June
 21 June – Justus de Harduwijn (born 1582), poet

References